Temple Bar Airport  is a public use airport in Mohave County, Arizona, United States. The airport is owned by the U.S. National Park Service.

Facilities and aircraft 
It has one runway with an asphalt surface:
 18/36 measuring 3,500 by 50 feet (1,067 x 15 m).

For the 12-month period ending April 20, 2010, the airport had 950 aircraft operations, an average of 79 per month: 74% general aviation and 26% air taxi.

References

External links 
 Temple Bar Airport (U30) at Arizona DOT airport directory
 Aerial image as of June 1994 from USGS The National Map
 Nearby Temple Bar Marina
 

Airports in Mohave County, Arizona
National Park Service